The Cyclone Zircon Project is a large mineral sands deposit located in the Eucla Basin in Western Australia, near the border with South Australia. Cyclone represents one of the largest zirconium reserves in Australia having estimated reserves of 98 million tonnes of ore grading 0.95% zirconium metal.

References 

Zirconium mines in Australia